Pan Wenshi (born 1937) is a Chinese biologist and Peking University professor. His research works on Giant panda, White-headed langur and Chinese white dolphin in the last 36 years are internationally recognized contributions. Pan had authored and co-authored 40-50 treatises published on various domestic and international journals including National Geographic and Nature and he is renowned for his academic achievements on researching the 3 near-extinct contemporary species. He serves as the director of the Giant Panda and Wildlife Conservation Research Center at Peking University. His work proved that panda habitat needed to be protected for them to survive in the wild and that pandas are polygamous, where previously it was thought that a dominant male secured exclusive breeding rights.

Biography
Pan was born in Bangkok, Thailand in 1937 where his family had lived for five generations. When he was three years old, he moved with his parents to Shantou in Guangdong province.

Pan studied biology at Peking University. His first experience with pandas was seeing the world's first captive-born panda at the Beijing zoo where he got to hold the infant panda.

He has also helped save the white-headed langur species through his work at the Nongguan Nature Reserve in Chongzuo, China. His work to save the langurs focused on both protecting the species, and improving the lives of the nearby villagers who were competing for resources with the langurs. The population of langurs declined from 2,000 in the late 1980s to just 96 when Pan began his work in 1996. Through Pan's efforts, the population has since climbed to over 500 in 2008.

Academic thoughts
In his book The Natural Refuge of Giant Panda at Qinling co-authored with postgraduates under his supervision, researchers and other collaborators, Pan put forward for the first time arguments supporting “giant pandas in Qinling can survive living in natural conditions”  which was acclaimed by international peers to be “significant contribution to the biological theory of giant panda”. Following that in his book Chance for Continual Survival Pan commented that “since the cause leading to the near-extinct of giant panda was human error, it must require human to rectify their acts in order giant pandas could have a chance for continual survival”.  In the book The White Dolphins of Qinzhou Pan and his co-authors unveiled that Chinese white dolphin appeared in Beibu Gulf only from 6000 years ago and that in the Beibu Gulf population is preserved an ancient and rare genotype that is so far never found in populations in other territorial waters.  In the book he as well suggested that the social developments of Qinzhou must be planned to optimize a win-win situation between its economy and nature conservation for that is the only way to achieve sustainable development.  The Natural History of White-headed Langur is a live record of researches in wilderness.  When Pan went into the Nongguan Mountains he noticed there the sustenance environment was almost totally devastated and that “human was suffering more miserably than the langurs there”.  In view of which he suggested “the core issue of nature conservation in Nongguan Mountains is to improve the living conditions of the people there.  Only after people’s lives been improved could white-headed langur conservation be anticipated”.  20 years practice of his words has proved his foresight; during the period the white-headed langur population in Nongguan Mountains has increased from the initial of about 100 individuals to about 820 individuals, and the people there have as well gradually improved their livings to well-off standard.

Peking University Press is proud to present the monograph series of Prof. Pan Wenshi.  How do we see the scientific achievements by Prof. Pan Wenshi?  We find his practical achievements far exceed the many monographs and treatises he published; he has achieved conserving the 3 near-extinct species in their natural habitats and that their populations have increased in multiple folds.  And by the unwavering efforts of Prof. Pan Wenshi the local people are benefited in the course of protecting those animals and are proud to have conserved the animals.

Awards

For his outstanding contributions in nature conservation over 30 years, Pan Wenshi was awarded more than ten China National Awards and 7 international awards.  Amongst them are:
 
 Year 1992 National "May 1 Labor" Award
 Year 1994 China National Federation of Returned Overseas Chinese Patriot Dedication
 Year 1996 North America Grizzly Funds-Special Scientific Achievement Award (科學特別成就獎)
 October 1996 Zoological Society of San Diego "Conservation Medal"
 Year 1996 Prince Bernhard of Netherlands the "Golden Ark"
 Year 1999 World Wildlife Fund (WWF) "Paul Getty Award"
 Year 2008 Ford Motor Co. Environmental Conservation Prize "Contributions to Ecological Civilization Award"
 Year 2010 "Worldly Influential Chinese Award"
 Year 2014 City of Beijing "Metropolitan Prize" Special Honor

References

External links
 Pan Wenshi home page documenting his work
 Trachypithecus_poliocephalus

Chinese biologists
Chinese conservationists
Giant pandas
Living people
1937 births
Pan Wenshi
Peking University alumni
Academic staff of Peking University